The Edward A. Thomas Building, or 1200 Travis, is a 28-story building in Downtown Houston, Texas that is currently occupied by the Houston Police Department as its current headquarters. At one time it was known as the Houston Natural Gas Building. The building houses HPD's administrative and investigative offices.

The police department's , three-floor crime laboratory, a  fitness center, a  voice/data room, a  24-hour emergency tactical command center, and a fingerprinting laboratory are located in the building.

History
The building, originally the Entex Building, was built in 1967. A renovation in 1988 involved the installation of a new central plant. In 1994 the City of Houston bought the building to house the headquarters of the Houston Police Department. In February 1995 the Houston City Council unanimously voted to retain the Hines company as the development manager for the renovation of 1200 Travis. In the 1990s Hercules Engineering and Testing Services received a contract to do testing in the renovated 1200 Travis building. In October 1997 the $21 million renovation was completed.

In 2007 the Houston Police Department announced that it was opening a gift shop inside the building. The Museum, Gift Shop, and officers' memorial opened on May 12.

In 2008 Harold Hurtt, the head of HPD, proposed a plan which would have involved the City of Houston selling 1200 Travis. In regards to a proposed new police headquarters, Hurtt said "It is not a building like 1200 Travis, which was built to be an office building."

In 2011 Mayor of Houston Annise Parker said that the city is considering selling the 1200 Travis facility so that the city will not have to lay off 273 jailers. As of 2012 the facility is for sale.

Gallery

See also

List of tallest buildings in Texas
Architecture of Houston

References

External links 

Houston Police Department Headquarters at Emporis
HPD Home Page

Houston Police Department
Bank company headquarters in the United States
Skyscraper office buildings in Houston
Office buildings completed in 1967
Headquarters in the United States
Police headquarters
Police stations in the United States
Buildings and structures in Houston